Elections to Tower Hamlets London Borough Council were held on 4 May 1978. Following boundary changes, the whole council was up for election. Turnout was 28.3%.

Election result

|}

Results

References

1978
1978 London Borough council elections
20th century in the London Borough of Tower Hamlets